Spitzingsee is a lake in Bavaria, Germany.

Geography
The Spitzingsee is located about five kilometers south of the Schliersee and a few hundred meters south of the Spitzingsattels at an altitude of 1084 m in the Schliersee Mountains in the Bavarian Alps.

The lake is owned by the Free State of Bavaria; the Bavarian Administration of State-Owned Palaces, Gardens and Lakes is responsible for its administration.
.

Footnotes

See also
List of lakes in Bavaria

External links

Lakes of Bavaria
Miesbach (district)